Anna Frolina, (née Boulygina , born 11 January 1984) is a South Korean (since 2016) and Russian (until 2015) biathlete. Currently she resides at Khanty-Mansiysk, Russia.

Career
Started competing in the World Cup in 2006–07 season ranking 31 in the Biathlon World Cup total score. She missed most of the 2007–08 season due to knee injury. In May 2008, she reappeared on the Russia's national team, and after summer training sessions was admitted to the World Cup. On 21 December 2008 in Hochfilzen came her first World Cup win shared with the relay teammates.

First World Cup win came in Antholz-Anterselva Pursuit on 24 January 2009, when she spectacularly stormed the last meters of the course to brush her rivals off the top spot.

Frolina (at time Boulygina) qualified for the 2010 Winter Olympics and made the strongest debut among the Russian Olympic first-timers in biathlon coming 4th in the sprint at Whistler Blackcomb Olympic park, just missing the podium by 1.2 seconds.

Her best result to date is a performance at the 2009 World Championships in Korea when she helped her teammates Svetlana Sleptsova, Olga Medvedtseva, Olga Zaitseva win the relay.

She represented South Korea from the 2016–17 season.

References

External links

1984 births
Living people
People from Yamalo-Nenets Autonomous Okrug
Russian female biathletes
Biathletes at the 2010 Winter Olympics
Biathletes at the 2018 Winter Olympics 
Olympic biathletes of Russia
Olympic biathletes of South Korea 
Biathlon World Championships medalists
South Korean female biathletes
Russian emigrants to South Korea
Naturalized citizens of South Korea
Sportspeople from Yamalo-Nenets Autonomous Okrug